John Badham (31 January 1919 – 1 January 1992) was an English professional footballer who played as a full back or left half. He played 175 games in the Football League for Birmingham City in the top two divisions.

Badham was born in Birmingham. He began his football career as an amateur with Birmingham (later renamed Birmingham City) in 1934 but his career was seriously disrupted by the Second World War. He turned professional in 1946 after his Army service. He helped the club win the Second Division championship in 1947–48 and 1954–55. He played in the semifinal of the 1955–56 FA Cup in place of the injured Roy Warhurst, but Johnny Newman was preferred for the final. He was an adaptable, two-footed player, whose position of choice was full-back but who was used in a variety of positions by the club. He had a spell at Stourbridge before returning to Birmingham on the coaching staff, later becoming manager of Moor Green. He died in Birmingham aged 72.

Honours
Birmingham City
 Football League Second Division champions: 1947–48, 1954–55

References
 

1919 births
1992 deaths
Footballers from Birmingham, West Midlands
English footballers
Association football fullbacks
Association football wing halves
Birmingham City F.C. players
Stourbridge F.C. players
English football managers
British Army personnel of World War II